Gil Stein (born January 9, 1956) is an American archaeologist. He was director of the Oriental Institute at the University of Chicago from 2003 to 2017.

Stein received a B.A. from Yale University in 1978 and a Ph.D. in 1988 from the University of Pennsylvania. In 1990, he was appointed an assistant professor at the Department of Anthropology at Northwestern University, and in 2001 became a full professor at the same department. In 2002, he moved to the University of Chicago.  Since 2008 he has jointly directed the Joint Syrian-American Archaeological Research Project at Tell Zeidan of the Ubaid culture. In 2017, Stein was appointed Senior Advisor to the Provost for Cultural Heritage at the University of Chicago.

Publications
Rethinking World Systems - Diasporas, Colonies, and Interaction in Uruk Mesopotamia, Tucson: University of Arizona, 1999. 
The Archaeology of Colonial Encounters: Comparative Perspectives. School of American Research Press, 2005.

Awards
National Science Foundation Graduate Fellow
Fulbright Scholar in Turkey (1982–83)

Notes

External links
University of Chicago Faculty Page
Brief Biography Page announcing Appointment as OI Director - University of Chicago web page
Profile, Director Gil Stein, Oriental Institute (Facebook page)

Living people
American archaeologists
Northwestern University faculty
University of Chicago faculty
Yale College alumni
University of Pennsylvania School of Arts and Sciences alumni
1956 births